Ramón Landestoy Troncoso (born February 16, 1983) is a Dominican former professional baseball pitcher. He played in Major League Baseball (MLB) for the Los Angeles Dodgers and Chicago White Sox.

Career

Los Angeles Dodgers
Troncoso signed as a non-drafted free agent by the Dodgers on June 20, 2002, Troncoso played his first three professional seasons for the Dodgers Dominican Summer League team.

In 2005, he was sent to the Rookie-League Ogden Raptors, where he led the team in saves with 13.

He pitched for the Class-A Columbus Catfish and the Class-A Advanced Vero Beach Dodgers in 2006, and was ranked as the 22nd best prospect in the Dodger organization by Baseball America. With Vero Beach he went 1-3 with a 6.75 ERA in 18 appearances. He pitched in 23 games, going 4-0 with 15 saves and a 2.41 ERA with Columbus, tossing seven hitless frames with five strikeouts during his final six outings.

Troncoso split the 2007 season between the Single-A Inland Empire 66ers of San Bernardino and the Double-A Jacksonville Suns. He was added to the Dodgers 40-man roster after the '07 season, and made his Major League Debut on April 1, 2008, for the Dodgers against the San Francisco Giants. He pitched to one batter and induced an inning-ending double-play. He split the season between the Triple-A Las Vegas 51s and the Dodgers. He finished the 2008 season with a record of 1-1 and a 4.26 ERA in 32 relief appearances for the Dodgers.

In 2009 Troncoso spent the entire season with the Dodgers, working in a team high 73 games and finishing 5-4 with a 2.72 ERA. In 2010, he appeared in 52 games with the Dodgers, though he was briefly reassigned to AAA in mid-season. Overall, he was 2-3 with a 4.33 ERA.

To begin 2011, Troncoso joined the Triple-A Albuquerque Isotopes. However, on April 16, he was recalled from the minors when Hong-Chih Kuo was placed on the disabled list. He was optioned back to the minors five days later after allowing 12 hits in 2 2/3 innings pitched. He spent most of the season with the Isotopes, pitching in 35 games with a 2-4 record and 5.05 ERA before rejoining the Dodgers in September. With the Dodgers he appeared in 18 games and had a high ERA of 6.75. The Dodgers designated him for assignment on March 22, 2012 and removed him from the 40-man roster. He spent the entire 2012 season in Albuquerque and was 4-1 with a 6.67 ERA in 45 games.

Chicago White Sox
He signed a minor league contract with the Chicago White Sox in November, 2012. Ramon was called up from the minors June 7, 2013 - to provide depth in the White Sox bullpen after numerous injuries to the pitching staff. He was outrighted to the minors on October 4, 2013. In 29 games for the White Sox, he was 1-4 with a 4.50 ERA.

Kansas City Royals
Troncoso signed a minor league deal with the Kansas City Royals on March 14, 2014, and was released from the club on July 21, 2014 after appearing in 24 games with a 1-6 record and 4.30 ERA for the Omaha Storm Chasers.

Return to the Dodgers
Troncoso signed a minor league contract with the Dodgers in February 2015 and he was assigned to the AA Tulsa Drillers to start the season. After two appearances in AA he was promoted to the AAA Oklahoma City Dodgers, where he was 5–1 with a 1.98 ERA in 29 games (including two starts).

Leones de Yucatán
Troncoso signed with the Leones de Yucatán of the Mexican Baseball League on March 29, 2016. He was released on May 15, 2016.

Olmecas de Tabasco
On May 27, 2016, Troncoso signed with the Olmecas de Tabasco of the Mexican Baseball League. He was released on April 11, 2017.

Coaching
In January 2018, it was announced that Troncoso had taken a job as a pitching coach for the Dodgers Dominican Summer League affiliate. He was promoted to the Rancho Cucamonga Quakes in 2021.

References

External links

1983 births
Living people
Albuquerque Isotopes players
Azucareros del Este players
Charlotte Knights players
Chicago White Sox players
Columbus Catfish players
Dominican Republic baseball coaches
Dominican Republic expatriate baseball players in Mexico
Dominican Republic expatriate baseball players in the United States
Indios de Mayagüez players
Dominican Republic expatriate baseball players in Puerto Rico
Inland Empire 66ers of San Bernardino players
Jacksonville Suns players
Las Vegas 51s players
Dominican Republic people of French descent
Dominican Republic people of Portuguese descent
Leones de Yucatán players
Los Angeles Dodgers players
Major League Baseball players from the Dominican Republic
Major League Baseball pitchers
Mexican League baseball pitchers
Minor league baseball coaches
Ogden Raptors players
Oklahoma City Dodgers players
Olmecas de Tabasco players
Omaha Storm Chasers players
People from San José de Ocoa Province
Toros del Este players
Tulsa Drillers players
Vero Beach Dodgers players